Sina Kolegaon Dam is a  dam on Sina river near Paranda, Osmanabad district in the state of Maharashtra in India.

Specifications

See also
 Dams in Maharashtra
 List of reservoirs and dams in India

References

Dams in Osmanabad district
Dams completed in 2007
2007 establishments in Maharashtra